Sundown is a rural locality in the Southern Downs Region, Queensland, Australia. It is on the Queensland border with New South Wales.

References 

Southern Downs Region
Localities in Queensland